Fez is a 1964 painting by the modern artist Frank Stella. Multiple editions of the work exist, with one additionally in the collection of the Museum of Modern Art in New York.

References

1964 paintings
Paintings by Frank Stella
Paintings in Buffalo, New York